The Carry On series is a long-running British sequence of comedy films, stage shows and television programmes produced between 1958 and 1992. Distributed by Anglo-Amalgamated from 1958 to 1966, and the Rank Organisation from 1967 to 1978, the films were all made at Pinewood Studios. The series' humour relied largely on innuendo and double entendre. There were thirty-one films, four TV Christmas specials, one television series of thirteen episodes, and three West End and provincial stage plays, all made on time and to a strict budget.

Peter Rogers and Gerald Thomas were the series' sole producer and director respectively. They mostly employed the same crew and a regular group of actors. The main cast predominantly featured Sid James, Kenneth Williams, Charles Hawtrey, Joan Sims, Kenneth Connor, Peter Butterworth, Hattie Jacques, Terry Scott, Bernard Bresslaw, Barbara Windsor, Jack Douglas and Jim Dale.  The Carry Ons comprise the largest number of films of any British series and, next to the James Bond films, are the second-longest continually-running UK film series (with a fourteen-year hiatus between 1978 and 1992). Between 1958 and 1992, there were seven writers, principally Norman Hudis (1958–62) and Talbot Rothwell (1963–74). The films were scored by three different composers: Bruce Montgomery from 1958–62; Eric Rogers (1963–75, 1977–78) and Max Harris who scored the 1976 film Carry On England.

In 1969, the UK television channel ITV televised a Christmas special recorded by Thames Television; entitled Carry On Christmas, it was watched by over eight million viewers.  Subsequent Christmas specials were recorded in 1970, 1972 and 1973. In 1975, a 13-episode television series was commissioned by ATV for ITV. Carry On Laughing ran for two seasons, with six half-hour episodes in season one and seven in season two. The writer Penelope Gilliatt wrote: "The usual charge to make against the Carry On films is to say that they could be so much better done.  This is true enough. They look dreadful, they seem to be edited with a bacon slicer, the effects are perfunctory, and the comic rhythm jerks along like a cat on a cold morning. But if all these things were more elegant, I do not really think the films would be more enjoyable: the badness is part of the funniness."

Filmography

Television

Stage shows

References

Sources

Further reading

External links
 Carry On Films at The Whippit Inn
 What a Carry On
 Carry On Forever
 Carry on Films at IMDb